Édith Lucie Bongo Ondimba (March 10, 1964 – March 14, 2009) was the First Lady of Gabon as the wife of President Omar Bongo from 1989 to 2009.

Biography
Édith Lucie Bongo Ondimba was born March 10, 1964. She was the daughter of Republic of the Congo President, Denis Sassou Nguesso. Her marriage to President Bongo on August 4, 1989, was reportedly viewed politically as an example of cooperation between the two countries, according to Reuters.

She was a medical doctor by education, a pediatrician, with HIV/AIDS as one of her main focuses. She helped create a forum for African first ladies to fight AIDS and founded associations for vulnerable children and people with disabilities.

Later life and death
In 2009, she was hospitalized in Rabat, Morocco. On March 14, 2009, she died at the hospital, four days after her 45th birthday. The statement announcing her death specified neither the cause of death nor the nature of her illness. She had not appeared in public for around three years preceding her death. After the state funeral in Libreville, Gabon, Édith Bongo's remains were taken to Edu, her father's home village in northern Congo for a traditional Mbochi tribal burial in the family cemetery there on March 20, 2009. The burial, nationally televised in Gabon and Congo, was attended by Presidents Bongo, Sassou Nguesso, and by the presidents of Benin, Central African Republic, Democratic Republic of Congo, Equatorial Guinea and Togo.

Following her death, it was announced on Gabonese television on 6 May 2009 that Omar Bongo was "temporarily suspending his activities" as President in order to "regain strength and rest". The announcement stressed that Bongo had been deeply affected by the illness and death of his wife. President Bongo died a month later on 8 June 2009, nearly three months after Edith's death, at a clinic in Barcelona, Spain.

References

1964 births
2009 deaths
Gabonese women physicians
First ladies and gentlemen of Gabon
Gabonese people of Republic of the Congo descent
Republic of the Congo women physicians
Children of national leaders
Gabonese pediatricians
21st-century Gabonese people